Andrew John Dalton (born 14 March 1947, Horsforth, Yorkshire, England) was an English first-class cricketer, who played twenty one first-class, and seventeen one day matches, for Yorkshire County Cricket Club between 1969 and 1972.

A right-handed batsman, he scored 710 first-class runs at 24.48, with a best score of 128 against Middlesex.  He scored his other first-class centuries against Worcestershire and Oxford University.  He scored 280 one day runs, with a top score of 55.

Dalton also played for Yorkshire Second XI from 1965 to 1972.

References

External links
Cricinfo Profile
Cricket Archive Statistics

Yorkshire cricketers
People from Horsforth
1947 births
Living people
English cricketers
Sportspeople from Yorkshire